Coykendall is a surname. Notable people with the surname include
Jim Coykendall, American mathematician
Mike Coykendall, American musician

See also
Coykendall Lodge, former home and current ruin in Hardenburgh, New York